Paul Berry is an English former professional footballer who played as a midfielder for non league side Warrington Town AFC before playing in the Football League for Chester City.

References

External links

Chester City F.C. players
Warrington Town F.C. players
Leek Town F.C. players
Association football midfielders
English Football League players
1978 births
Rhyl F.C. players
Living people
Footballers from Warrington
English footballers